Sonia represented the United Kingdom in the Eurovision Song Contest 1993, singing "Better the Devil You Know". The song, chosen from a selection broadcast on A Song for Europe, was placed second in the contest.

Before Eurovision

Artist selection
A shortlist of artists included by the BBC was presented to the Head of Delegations of each participating country in the Eurovision Song Contest that ultimately selected the British entrant. Sonia was revealed by the BBC as the British entrant for the 1993 Eurovision Song Contest. The UK branch of the International Eurovision Fan Club (OGAE), had conducted a poll in late 1991, asking the members to nominate which singer they'd like to represent the UK in the contest. Sonia was the overwhelming winner of that poll, announced in early 1992.

A Song for Europe 1993
Two songs each, both performed by Sonia, were premiered during four preview programmes on BBC1 between 14 March and 4 April 1993. The final, held at the BBC Television Centre in London and hosted by Terry Wogan, was filmed earlier on 8 April 1993 and televised on 9 April 1993. The show was broadcast on BBC1 and BBC Radio 2 with commentary by Ken Bruce. A public televote selected the winning song, "Better the Devil You Know", which was revealed during a separate show broadcast on BBC1 and hosted by Terry Wogan.

Sonia released the winning song on an Arista vinyl 7" single, 12" single, CD single and cassette, reaching no. 15 in the UK singles chart. The top four songs were included in her album Better The Devil You Know, released by Arista just after the Eurovision final. The album peaked at no. 32 in the UK album chart. The remaining four tracks have not been released in any official format.

At Eurovision
Twenty five countries participated in the final of the Eurovision Song Contest, held at the Green Glens Arena in Millstreet, Ireland on 15 May. "Better the Devil You Know" was placed second with 164 points. It received points from every country apart from Greece and Malta.

Voting

References

1993
Countries in the Eurovision Song Contest 1993
Eurovision
Eurovision